The Yellowstone Quake is a  USA Hockey-sanctioned Tier III junior ice hockey team playing in the North American 3 Hockey League (NA3HL). The team plays their home games at Victor Riley Arena in Cody, Wyoming. The franchise is a non-profit corporation operated by the Park County Junior A Hockey Program.

History
The franchise was previously located in Coeur d'Alene, Idaho, originally known as the Kootenai Colts and then the Coeur d'Alene Colts as part of the Northern Pacific Hockey League (NorPac). While in Coeur d'Alene, the franchise won the NorPac's 2001–02 Cascade Cup Championship.

In 2012, the Quake joined the American West Hockey League (AWHL) for the league's second season.

In March 2014, the AWHL joined the North American 3 Hockey League as the new Frontier Division for the 2014–15 season.

Season-by-season records

Alumni
The Quake have had a number of alumni move on to collegiate programs, higher levels of junior ice hockey in the United States and Canada.  In 2013, former Quake player Jacob Doty signed a three-year deal with the St. Louis Blues of the National Hockey League.

References

External links
 Quake Website
 NA3HL Website

Ice hockey teams in Wyoming
Park County, Wyoming
American West Hockey League teams
2006 establishments in Wyoming
Ice hockey clubs established in 2006